The 2021 Dubai Tennis Championships (also known as the Dubai Duty Free Tennis Championships for sponsorship reasons) was an ATP 500 event on the 2021 ATP Tour and a WTA 1000 tournament on the 2021 WTA Tour. Both events were originally scheduled for February 15 to 21 and February 22 to 28 for women's and men's tournaments, respectively. They were rescheduled to March 7 to 13 and March 14 to 20 due to the Australian Open reschedule and were held at the Aviation Club Tennis Centre in Dubai, United Arab Emirates.

Champions

Men's singles

  Aslan Karatsev def.  Lloyd Harris, 6–3, 6–2

This was Karatsev's first ATP Tour singles title.

Women's singles

  Garbiñe Muguruza def.  Barbora Krejčíková, 7–6(8–6), 6–3

Men's doubles

  Juan Sebastián Cabal /  Robert Farah def.  Nikola Mektić /  Mate Pavić, 7–6(7–0), 7–6(7–4)

Women's doubles

  Alexa Guarachi /  Darija Jurak def.  Xu Yifan /  Yang Zhaoxuan, 6–0, 6–3

ATP singles main-draw entrants

Seeds 

 Rankings are as of March 8, 2021.

Other entrants 
The following players received wildcards into the singles main draw:
  Malek Jaziri 
  Aslan Karatsev
  Dennis Novak
  Alexei Popyrin

The following player received entry using as a special exempt:
  Matthew Ebden

The following players received entry from the qualifying draw:
  Yuki Bhambri 
  Lloyd Harris
  Mikhail Kukushkin
  Christopher O'Connell
  Emil Ruusuvuori
  Bernabé Zapata Miralles

The following players received entry as lucky losers:
  Radu Albot
  Lorenzo Giustino

Withdrawals 
Before the tournament
  Matteo Berrettini → replaced by  Alejandro Davidovich Fokina
  Borna Ćorić → replaced by  Lorenzo Giustino
  Roger Federer → replaced by  Yoshihito Nishioka
  Nick Kyrgios → replaced by  Aljaž Bedene
  Gaël Monfils → replaced by  Márton Fucsovics
  Stan Wawrinka → replaced by  Radu Albot

Retirements 
  Matthew Ebden
  Jo-Wilfried Tsonga

ATP doubles main-draw entrants

Seeds 

 Rankings are as of March 8, 2021.

Other entrants
The following pairs received wildcards into the doubles main draw:
  Omar Alawadhi /  Hamad Abbas Janahi 
  Vasek Pospisil /  Nenad Zimonjić

The following pair received entry from the qualifying draw:
  Lorenzo Sonego /  Andrea Vavassori

Withdrawals 
Before the tournament
  Henri Kontinen /  Édouard Roger-Vasselin → replaced by  Henri Kontinen /  Jordan Thompson
  Sander Gillé /  Joran Vliegen → replaced by  David Goffin /  Joran Vliegen
  Karen Khachanov /  Andrey Rublev → replaced by  Marcelo Arévalo /  Matwé Middelkoop

WTA singles main-draw entrants

Seeds 

 Rankings are as of March 1, 2021.

Other entrants
The following players received wildcards into the singles main draw:
  Tímea Babos
  Coco Gauff
  Anastasia Potapova

The following player received entry into the singles main draw using a protected ranking:
  Yaroslava Shvedova

The following players received entry from the qualifying draw:
  Irina-Camelia Begu 
  Ana Bogdan
  Kaia Kanepi
  Ana Konjuh
  Liang En-shuo
  Tereza Martincová
  Lesia Tsurenko
  Katarina Zavatska

The following players received entry as lucky losers:
  Misaki Doi
  Viktoriya Tomova
  Martina Trevisan

Withdrawals 
Before the tournament
  Bianca Andreescu → replaced by  Alizé Cornet
  Victoria Azarenka → replaced by  Martina Trevisan
  Paula Badosa → replaced by  Misaki Doi
  Ashleigh Barty → replaced by  Kateřina Siniaková
  Jennifer Brady → replaced by  Bernarda Pera
  Danielle Collins → replaced by  Kristýna Plíšková
  Fiona Ferro → replaced by  Viktoriya Tomova
  Simona Halep → replaced by  Jessica Pegula
  Sofia Kenin → replaced by  Kristina Mladenovic
  Magda Linette → replaced by  Jil Teichmann
  Karolína Muchová → replaced by  Barbora Krejčíková
  Yulia Putintseva → replaced by  Paula Badosa
  Alison Riske → replaced by  Anastasija Sevastova
  Barbora Strýcová → replaced by  Laura Siegemund
  Donna Vekić → replaced by  Patricia Maria Țig
  Zhang Shuai → replaced by  Shelby Rogers

Retirements 
  Petra Kvitová (right adductor)

WTA doubles main-draw entrants

Seeds 

 Rankings are as of March 1, 2021.

Other entrants
The following pairs received a wildcard into the doubles main draw:
  Sarah Behbehani /  Çağla Büyükakçay 
  Eden Silva /  Rosalie van der Hoek

The following pairs received entry into the doubles main draw using protected rankings:
  Natela Dzalamidze /  Cornelia Lister
  Andreja Klepač /  Sania Mirza
  Aleksandra Krunić /  Alexandra Panova
  Elena Rybakina /  Yaroslava Shvedova

Withdrawals 
Before the tournament
  Zhang Shuai /  Zheng Saisai → replaced by  Shelby Rogers /  Zheng Saisai
  Sharon Fichman /  Monica Niculescu → replaced by  Monica Niculescu /  Anastasia Potapova

Retirements 
  Monica Niculescu /  Anastasia Potapova (eye injury)

References

External links
 Official website
 Women's Singles Qualifying Draw

2021
2021 ATP Tour
2021 WTA Tour
 
March 2021 sports events in the United Arab Emirates
2021 in Emirati tennis
Tennis events postponed due to the COVID-19 pandemic